Apprends-moi may refer to:
 "Apprends-moi" (Roberto Bellarosa song), 2012
 Apprends-moi, a song by Sylvie Vartan, 1969
 Apprends-moi, a song by Ana Torroja, 2001
 Apprends-moi, a song by Celine Dion from her 2003 album, 1 fille & 4 types
 Apprends-moi, a song by Hélène Ségara, 2008
 Apprends-moi, a song by Superbus, 2009
 Apprends-moi, a song by Christian Delagrange, 2012
 Apprends-moi, a song by Fraissinet, 2017